Sir Charles Coote, 1st Baronet (1581–1642) was an English soldier, administrator and landowner who lived in Ireland.

Birth and origins 
He was born into a Devonshire family, the son of Sir Nicholas Coote.

Early life 
In 1600 he moved to Ireland as a captain of the 100th Foot Regiment in the army of Lord Mountjoy, Lord Deputy of Ireland, where he fought in the last few years of the Nine Years War and was at the Siege of Kinsale in 1601–02, which ultimately led to the defeat of the O'Neills.

In 1605 he was appointed Provost-Marshal of Connaught for life and in 1613 was appointed to the office of General Collector and Receiver of the King's Composition Money for Connaught, also for life. In 1620 he was promoted to vice-President of Connaught.

Marriage and children 
Before 1617 he married Dorothea younger daughter and coheir of Hugh Cuffe of Cuffe's Wood, County Cork.

Charles and Dorothea had five children, four sons:
Charles, who would be created Earl of Mountrath.
Chidley
Richard, became Baron Coote of Coloony
Thomas (died 1671)

—and one daughter
Laetitia, married Sir Francis Hamilton, 1st Baronet, of Killock, also called of Killeshandra, County Cavan

Honours 
On 2 April 1621 he was made a baronet (of Castle Cuffe in Queen's County).

He became a substantial landowner and served as a commissioner to examine and contest Irish land titles. In 1634 he was appointed Custos Rotulorum of Queen's County, again for life. He was elected Member of Parliament (M.P.) in the Parliament of Ireland for Queen's County in 1639.

Irish rebellion and death 
When the Irish Uprising of 1641 began, Coote was appointed Governor of Dublin and instructed to raise a regiment. He then marched south to secure Wicklow, marching north in 1642 to defeat the rebels at Swords and Kilsallaghan. In April 1642, he was ordered by James Butler, 1st Duke of Ormonde to relieve the beleaguered garrisons at Birr, Burris, and Knocknamease, after which he rejoined Ormonde's main force to defeat the Irish Confederates at the Battle of Kilrush in April, 1642. In early May of that year, he helped capture the garrisons of Philipstown and Trim, but was killed at Trim on 7 May 1642 during a Confederate counter-attack.

Citations

Sources 

 – 1611 to 1625

External links 
 Sir Charles Coote and the 1641 Rebellion in Ireland
 

1581 births
1642 deaths
Military personnel from Devon
English army officers
Baronets in the Baronetage of Ireland
Irish MPs 1639–1649
Members of the Parliament of Ireland (pre-1801) for Queen's County constituencies